Tolworth Girls' School is a secondary school and sixth form for girls aged 11–18 in Surbiton, London, England, in the Royal Borough of Kingston Upon Thames.

The school currently has 1035 girls on roll and just under 290 students in the mixed sixth form. The school has received awards including a specialism in Technology, Leading Edge School, Training School and the Artsmark Gold award.

In 2007 and in 2017, it was rated 1-outstanding, by Ofsted. Its link school is Southborough High School, another local school. In August 2011 the school converted to academy status.

It is directly next to the north side of the A3 Kingston Bypass, near the Red Lion Business Park, not far from the A243 junction (Hook underpass), between Tolworth and Hook.

The Prime Minister's Global Fellowship
Students have attained places on the Prime Minister's Global Fellowship programme every year for the last three years. The Prime Minister's Global Fellowship programme aims to offer 18- and 19-year-old students from England experience in one of three major emerging economies.

Notable former pupils

 Christine Blower, General Secretary since 2009 of the National Union of Teachers
 Rosalyn Landor, Film, television and stage actress and audio book narrator
 Debbie McGee, TV presenter, radio host, actress and TV magician Paul Daniels’s wife and assistant
 Kelly Reilly, actress
 Saskia Howard-Clarke, Big Brother 6 (UK) contestant and glamour model.
 Karina Bryant, British judoka, Olympic Medal Winner 2012
 Kim Tiddy (born 1977), actress
 India de Beaufort (born 1987), actress

References

External links
 
 EduBase

Audio clips
 Clarissa Williams on the Today programme on 18 November 2005

Training schools in England
Girls' schools in London
Academies in the Royal Borough of Kingston upon Thames
Educational institutions established in 1932
1932 establishments in England
Secondary schools in the Royal Borough of Kingston upon Thames